Savvas Damianou (born 22 May 1979. ) is a Cypriot football manager.

Alki Oroklini 
In 2015, he took on his first managerial appointment with Alki Oroklini.

External links

References

Cypriot football managers
1979 births
Living people
Nea Salamis Famagusta FC managers